Avalon Expo Sci-Fi, Fantasy, Gaming, Comic, Pop-Culture Convention, commonly known as AvEx, was founded in 2015.  It began as an annual weekend event held in St. John's, Newfoundland and Labrador in Atlantic Canada during late August, and has since expanded to a twice-yearly event in the first and second half of the year.

Activities and Events 
 Celebrity Q&A sessions
 Autograph and Photo Opportunities
 Guest Lectures
 Authors Readings
 Artist Alley
 Specialty Vendors
 Discussion Panels
 Costume Contest
 Dressing in Costume
 Gaming demonstrations, tournaments & play

Community Involvement 
Avalon Expo also held a two-day event in Gander, Newfoundland and Labrador called Central Pop Con.
Leah Cairns was guest.

Avalon Expo also holds a one-day event in the fall in Marystown called Burin Expo.
And another one-day event in the spring in Clarenville called c.dot.con.

Year Round Events

Avalon Expo History

Event History

External links 
 Official site

Science fiction conventions in Canada
Multigenre conventions